"Hit 'n' Run" (also spelled "Hit 'N' Run") is a song by German pop band Monrose. It was written by JoelJoel, The Provider and Charlie Mason and co-produced by Joel and Oscar Görres for the group's third studio album I Am (2008).

The track was released as the album's second single in Poland on 29 September 2008 and throughout German-speaking Europe on 3 October. It managed to reach the top 30 in Austria and number 16 in Germany, ending the run of the Monrose's consecutive top ten entries in Germany, beginning with 2006's "Shame".

Promotion 
Monrose performed the track on a number of occasions, including a performance at the finale of Elite Model Look 2008, a Swiss fashion programme.
It was also performed on the qualifying show of German televised singing competition Popstars.

Music video 
The music video for the song was shot on the week commencing 31 August 2008. The video is a roller-disco themed in the 80's. It premiered on 11 September on German music network VIVA's show VIVA Live!.

Track listings

Credits and personnel

Vocals: M. Capristo, S. Guemmour, B. Kızıl
Music: JoelJoel, The Provider
Lyrics: Charlie Mason
Production and mixing: JoelJoel, Oscar Gorres

Engineering: Tilmann Ilse
Assisted by: Christoph Grotjan
Recorded at Zwischengeschoss Studios, Hamburg, Germany
Vocal production and recording by Peter Keller

Charts

References

External links
 Official band website (archived)

2008 singles
Monrose songs
Songs with lyrics by Charlie Mason (lyricist)
2008 songs